Kappa Cygnids, abbreviated KCG and IAU shower number 12, was an episodic meteor shower that took place from June to September, peaking around August 13, along with the larger Perseids meteor shower. The radiant of the shower emerged from the antihelion source in late June and moves upwards to Cygnus in July. In early August, the radiant is just west of the star Vega and elongated in a north-south direction.  The shower then turns a corner and moves to the east in late August. The Kappa Cygnids are named for the position of the radiant at the peak of the shower, where the meteor shower will appear to line up in sky by the constellation Cygnus and the star Kappa Cygni. 

The Kappa Cygnids are unusual in that they are absent in most years, but appear every 7 years (see table below). The years 2020 and 2021 fit in that sequence. The shower is known for occasional bright fireballs with multiple flares.

Notes

External links 
https://web.archive.org/web/20101026003846/http://astronomia.org/shower?la=en&s=KCG
https://www.meteornews.net/2021/08/10/enhanced-kappa-cygnid-kcg0012-activity-in-2021/

Meteor showers
Cygnus (constellation)
August events